Scott Paul Shields (born March 29, 1976) is a former American football safety in the National Football League (NFL). He was drafted by the Pittsburgh Steelers in the second round of the 1999 NFL Draft. Shields played 26 games for the Steelers over two seasons, with two starts. He played college football for the Weber State Wildcats. He was also a member of the Scottish Claymores of NFL Europe.

External links
Just Sports Stats

1976 births
Living people
American football safeties
Kansas City Chiefs players
Pittsburgh Steelers players
Players of American football from San Diego
Scottish Claymores players
Weber State Wildcats football players